Terry Jones (born July 30, 1971) is a Canadian businessman and stock car racing team owner. He co-owns Rette Jones Racing, an ARCA Menards Series and ARCA Menards Series West team.

Career
In 1995, Jones formed Jones Group International, an Amherstburg, Ontario-based demolition company. The firm regularly sponsored Jones during his racing career.

Jones began racing in the ARCA Re/Max Series in 2003.

In 2010, Jones joined Team Gill Racing to race in the NASCAR Camping World Truck Series; the move was spurred by Jones' decision to race in NASCAR, a sanctioning body that he considered "a little more professional" than ARCA.

In 2014, Jones signed with Win-Tron Racing for the season opener at Daytona International Speedway. The following year, he partnered with spotter and friend Mark Rette to form Rette Jones Racing; Rette joked in 2019 that while he is the team's "sweat equity", Jones is "the money." Although Jones' racing career was placed on hiatus after a motorcycle accident, he continued his involvement with RJR. Serving as owner-driver, Jones finished 19th in RJR's debut ARCA race at Daytona, where he finished 19th after being involved in a late accident. The team also fielded a Truck program for Chad Finley, with Jones running the Talladega event. In 2016, an attempted return to the Truck Talladega race with Jones was canceled after he suffered a leg injury.

At the 2017 ARCA season opener, Jones recorded a career-best finish of second; he was leading the race until Austin Theriault passed him with eight laps remaining.

Motorsports career results

NASCAR
(key) (Bold – Pole position awarded by qualifying time. Italics – Pole position earned by points standings or practice time. * – Most laps led.)

Camping World Truck Series

ARCA Racing Series
(key) (Bold – Pole position awarded by qualifying time. Italics – Pole position earned by points standings or practice time. * – Most laps led.)

References

External links
 
 

Living people
1971 births
NASCAR drivers
NASCAR team owners
ARCA Menards Series drivers
Canadian racing drivers
People from Amherstburg, Ontario
Racing drivers from Ontario